The American National Ballet (Minnesota) closed in 2006. It was a ballet company based in Duluth, Minnesota, founded by Armando Maldonado in 2001.

A different ballet company using the American National Ballet name opened in Charleston, South Carolina in 2017 and folded several months later.

Background 
Armando Maldonado began his classical study with Patricia Delany of the Ballet Arts in San Antonio, Texas. After completing the beginning program he was offered a scholarship to study with Tunju Tuzer and Cathy Chamberlain in Dallas, Texas.  Following two years of elementary study Maldonado received a scholarship to study at University of North Carolina School of the Arts. While at N.C.S.A. he studied with Melissa Hayden, former prima of New York City Ballet; and Duncan Noble, former principal with the Ballet Russe de Monte Carlo. Maldonado studied with Abdul Hamzen of the Maryinsky Theatre in Budapest, Hungary, for advanced training.

Upon returning from Budapest he began his career as a student dancing with Pacific Northwest Ballet under the direction of Kent Stowell and Francia Russell, formerly of the New York City Ballet.  After completing that season he earned a contract dancing principal roles with the Oregon Ballet Theatreunder the direction of James Canfield, former principal with the Joffrey Ballet. After completing three seasons with OBT he joined the English National Ballet under the direction of Derek Deane, but due to an untimely injury he returned to the U.S. At this point he also began teaching. (Maldonado has taught across the U.S. and internationally at Cornish College of the Arts in Seattle, WA; the Los Angeles Ballet in Los Angeles, CA; University of Minnesotain Minneapolis, MN; Columbus State University in Columbus, GA; and The Walsh Academy in Melbourne, Australia.)

Upon recovering, Moldonado began taking part in guest appearances with the Faust Ballet in Berlin, the Nashville Ballet, San Diego City Ballet, and the Columbus Ballet. After a year of guesting appearances he accepted the post as the Associate Director of the Pacific Festival Ballet, where he created ten new works and danced principal and leading roles.

Founding 
After two years as Associate Director, Maldonado moved to Duluth, Minnesota, and founded the American National Ballet, where he created 45 additional works. Maldonado was celebrated by The Tribune and critically acclaimed for his “Innovative” works, and was considered “one to watch for”. Under his direction, the American National Ballet held a Los Angeles debut and he received an invitation from the Chinese government.

By Maldonado’s fifth year as director he nurtured the company to 20 full-time artists. During his tenure as Artistic Director, he served on the Minnesota State Arts Board, received both presidential recognition from President George W. Bush, and gubernatorial acknowledgements from former Minnesota Governor Tim Pawlenty and current Minnesota Governor Mark Dayton.

The America National Ballet danced a very eclectic repertoire as well as other works from famous choreographers as Twyla Tharp, Lisa McKhann, and Fernando Bujones.

Closure 
The American National Ballet closed its doors after a farewell performance on October 6, 2006.

References

External links
 Official website.

Ballet companies in the United States
Ballet schools in the United States
Duluth–Superior metropolitan area
Dance schools in the United States
2001 establishments in the United States
Performing groups established in 2001
Dance in Minnesota